Dungue Lima (born 24 February 1983) is a São Toméan footballer who has played for the São Tomé and Príncipe national team.

External links
 
 

1983 births
Living people
São Tomé and Príncipe international footballers
São Tomé and Príncipe footballers
UDESCAI players
Association football goalkeepers